The Speaker of the South Australian House of Assembly is the presiding officer of the South Australian House of Assembly, the lower house of the Parliament of South Australia. The other presiding officer is the President of the South Australian Legislative Council.

As of the passage of the Constitution (Independent Speaker) Amendment Act 2021, the Speaker is constitutionally banned from being a member of a registered political party outside of a "relevant election period".

The current Speaker is independent MP Dan Cregan.

List of speakers

References

 Statistical Record of the Legislature 1836 - 2007

External links
 Speakers of the House of Assembly. Parliament of South Australia.
 

South Australia